KPAS (103.1 FM) is a radio station broadcasting a Christian radio music format. Licensed to Fabens, Texas, United States. The station is currently owned by Algie a. Felder.

History
The station was assigned the call letters KLMF-FM on July 30, 1979.  On July 7, 1982, the station changed its call sign to the current KPAS.

History of call letters
The call letters KPAS previously belonged to an AM station in Banning, California, which began broadcasting November 9, 1949.

In September 1953, the FCC authorized assignment of the license of KPAS of Banning, California, from Byron-Wood Motors to Henry Chester Darwin, for $6,100.

References

External links

 

PAS